Rishaschia is a monotypic genus of South American jumping spiders containing the single species, Rishaschia mandibularis. It was first described by D. Makhan in 2006, and is found in Suriname, Ecuador, Guyana, Brazil, and French Guiana.

References

Endemic fauna of Suriname
Monotypic Salticidae genera
Salticidae
Spiders of South America